David Allen Loggins (born November 10, 1947) is an American singer, songwriter, and musician.

Musical career
Loggins is best known for his 1974 song composition "Please Come to Boston", which was a No. 5 popular music success (No. 1 Easy Listening) in the U.S. He was inducted into the Nashville Songwriters Hall of Fame in 1995. He is the second cousin of singer-songwriter Kenny Loggins, although they had never met until later in their professional careers.

Loggins also wrote the song "Pieces of April" for the band Three Dog Night, which was a Top 20 success during 1973. He has written material for Tanya Tucker, Restless Heart, Wynonna Judd, Reba McEntire, Gary Morris, Billy Ray Cyrus, Alabama, Toby Keith, Don Williams, Crystal Gayle, and the number one hits "Morning Desire" by Kenny Rogers and "You Make Me Want To Make You Mine" by Juice Newton. During 1984, he recorded "Nobody Loves Me Like You Do," a duet with Anne Murray, which scored number one on the Billboard Hot Country Singles chart. Loggins and Murray were named Vocal Duo of the Year at the CMA Awards during 1985.

One of Loggins' most famous musical compositions is "Augusta," which he wrote in 1981 while visiting The Augusta National Golf Club. The following year, CBS began using the song as a theme in its coverage each year of the Masters Golf Tournament. In 1982, David Lasley released a cover version of Loggins’ “If I Had My Wish Tonight”, originally released by Loggins in 1979.

Before becoming a musician, Loggins was employed as a draftsman and as an insurance salesman.

Discography

Studio albums

Singles

Guest singles

References

External links
Nashville Songwriters' Hall of Fame Profile
Dave Loggins at "What ever happened to..."

1947 births
Living people
American country songwriters
American male songwriters
East Tennessee State University alumni
Epic Records artists
Kenny Loggins
Music of East Tennessee
Music of Johnson County, Tennessee
People from Mountain City, Tennessee
Vanguard Records artists